The 2012–13 HC Slovan Bratislava season was the first season for Bratislava based club in Kontinental Hockey League.

Slovan opened the 2012–13 season with a home game against Ukrainian HC Donbass on 6 September 2012, losing 2–4 in front of a capacity crowd. The first win was achieved 4 days later by defeating Spartak Moscow 2–1 after shootout. During the NHL lockout between September 2012 and January 2013, two defenders Ľubomír Višňovský and Andrej Sekera enhanced the team. Slovan ended the season with 78 points as 6th of the Western conference and thus clinched the play-off in their first KHL season. In the first play-off round Slovan played against Dynamo Moscow and lost all four matches.

During the regular season, Slovan had sold out 25 out of its 26 home games with an average attendance of 9,977 spectators which was the 7th highest average attendance in Europe.

Schedule and results

Pre-season
Pre-season took part in July, August and September with 2 friendly matches and participating European Trophy.

|-bgcolor=ddffdd
| 1 || 24 July || Slovan Bratislava || 2–1 || SKA Saint Petersburg  || Slovnaft Arena || 7,603 || Slovan začal prípravu pred KHL víťazstvom nad Petrohradom - Šport - Šport - Webnoviny.sk
|-bgcolor=ddffdd
| 2 || 4 August || Slovan Bratislava || 3–1 || Spartak Moscow  || Slovnaft Arena || 8,765 || Slovan v príprave úspešný, zdolal Spartak Moskva
|-

|-
|-bgcolor=d0e7ff
| 1 || 31 July ||  Piráti Chomutov || 5 – 6 SO || Slovan Bratislava || SD Aréna || 3,082 || 0–1–0–0 || Game report - European Trophy | Europe's premium club competition
|-bgcolor=d0e7ff
| 2 || 10 August || Slovan Bratislava || 2 – 1 SO || Vienna Capitals || Slovnaft Arena || 6,097 || 0–2–0–0 || Game report - European Trophy | Europe's premium club competition
|-bgcolor=ffbbbb
| 3 || 14 August || Slovan Bratislava || 3–5 || Sparta Praha  || Slovnaft Arena || 8,843 || 0–2–0–1 || Game report - European Trophy | Europe's premium club competition
|-bgcolor=ffbbbb
| 4 || 17 August ||  Linköpings || 4–2 || Slovan Bratislava || Cloetta Center || 3,149 || 0–2–0–2 || Game report - European Trophy | Europe's premium club competition
|-bgcolor=ffbbbb
| 5 || 19 August ||  HV71 || 2–0 || Slovan Bratislava || Kinnarps Arena || 2,249 || 0–2–0–3 || Game report - European Trophy | Europe's premium club competition
|-bgcolor=ddffdd
| 6 || 24 August || Slovan Bratislava || 5–0 || JYP Jyväskylä  || Slovnaft Arena || 6,853 || 1–2–0–3 || Game report - European Trophy | Europe's premium club competition
|-bgcolor=d0e7ff
| 7|| 26 August || Slovan Bratislava || 3 – 2 OT || KalPa  || Slovnaft Arena || 6,849 || 1–3–0–3 || Game report - European Trophy | Europe's premium club competition
|-bgcolor=ffeeaa
| 8|| 31 August ||  Vienna Capitals || 2 – 1 OT || Slovan Bratislava || Albert-Schultz Eishalle || 4,300 || 1–3–1–3 || Game report - European Trophy | Europe's premium club competition
|-

|-
| align="center"|

Regular season

|-bgcolor=ffbbbb
|1 || 6 || Slovan Bratislava || 2–4 || Donbass Donetsk  || Slovnaft Arena || 10,055 || 0–0–0–1 || Livescores - Soccer - Scoresway
|-bgcolor=ffeeaa
|2 || 8 || Slovan Bratislava || 2 – 3 SO || Dinamo Riga  || Slovnaft Arena || 8,034 || 0–0–1–1 || Livescores - Soccer - Scoresway
|-bgcolor=d0e7ff
|3 || 10 || Slovan Bratislava || 2 – 1 SO || Spartak Moscow || Slovnaft Arena || 10,055 || 0–1–1–1 || Livescores - Soccer - Scoresway
|-bgcolor=ffbbbb
|4 || 13 ||  Dinamo Minsk || 4–3 || Slovan Bratislava || Minsk-Arena || 15,005 || 0–1–1–2 || Livescores - Soccer - Scoresway
|-bgcolor=ddffdd
|5 || 15 || Vityaz Chekhov || 0–3|| Slovan Bratislava || Ice Hockey Center 2004 || 2,900 || 1–1–1–2 || Livescores - Soccer - Scoresway
|-bgcolor=ddffdd
|6 || 17 || Slovan Bratislava || 4–2 || SKA Saint Petersburg || Slovnaft Arena || 10,055 || 2–1–1–2 || Livescores - Soccer - Scoresway
|-bgcolor=ddffdd
|7 || 22 || Slovan Bratislava  || 4–2 || Avangard Omsk || Slovnaft Arena || 10,055 || 3–1–1–2 || Livescores - Soccer - Scoresway
|-bgcolor=ddffdd
|8 || 24 || Slovan Bratislava || 4–2 || Barys Astana  || Slovnaft Arena || 10,055 || 4–1–1–2 || Livescores - Soccer - Scoresway
|-bgcolor=d0e7ff
|9 || 26 ||  Slovan Bratislava || 4 – 3 SO|| Yugra Khanty-Mansiysk || Slovnaft Arena || 10,055 || 4–2–1–2 || Livescores - Soccer - Scoresway
|-bgcolor=ffbbbb
|10 || 29 || Metallurg Magnitogorsk || 3–2|| Slovan Bratislava || Magnitogorsk Arena || 6,357 || 4–2–1–3 || Livescores - Soccer - Scoresway
|-

|-bgcolor=ffbbbb
| 11 || 1 || Traktor Chelyabinsk || 3–1 || Slovan Bratislava || Traktor Sport Palace || 7,500 || 4–2–1–4 || Livescores - Soccer - Scoresway
|-bgcolor=ddffdd
| 12 || 3 || Avtomobilist Yekaterinburg || 0–1 || Slovan Bratislava || KRK Uralets || 3,000 || 5–2–1–4 || Livescores - Soccer - Scoresway
|-bgcolor=ffbbbb
| 13 || 7 ||  Slovan Bratislava || 2–3 || Dynamo Moscow || Slovnaft Arena || 10,055 || 5–2–1–5 || Livescores - Soccer - Scoresway
|-bgcolor=d0e7ff
| 14 || 11 || Neftekhimik Nizhnekamsk || 4 – 5 SO || Slovan Bratislava || SCC Arena || 4,500 || 5–3–1–5 || Livescores - Soccer - Scoresway
|-bgcolor=ffeeaa
| 15 || 13 || Salavat Yulaev Ufa || 3 – 2 SO || Slovan Bratislava || Ufa Arena || 6,250 || 5–3–2–5 || Livescores - Soccer - Scoresway
|-bgcolor=d0e7ff
| 16 || 15 || Ak Bars Kazan || 2 – 3 SO || Slovan Bratislava || TatNeft Arena || 3,090 || 5–4–2–5 || Livescores - Soccer - Scoresway
|-bgcolor=ffbbbb
| 17 || 17 || Severstal Cherepovets || 6–0 || Slovan Bratislava || Ice Palace || 3,193 || 5–4–2–6 ||Livescores - Soccer - Scoresway
|-bgcolor=ffbbbb
| 18 || 23 || Slovan Bratislava || 2–3 || CSKA Moscow || Slovnaft Arena || 10,055 || 5–4–2–7 || Livescores - Soccer - Scoresway
|-bgcolor=ffbbbb
| 19 || 27 || Slovan Bratislava || 2–4 ||  Metallurg Novokuznetsk || Slovnaft Arena || 10,055 || 5–4–2–8 || Livescores - Soccer - Scoresway
|-bgcolor=ddffdd
| 20 || 29 || Slovan Bratislava || 4–2 || Amur Khabarovsk || Slovnaft Arena || 10,055 || 6–4–2–8 || Livescores - Soccer - Scoresway
|-bgcolor=ddffdd
| 21 || 30 || Slovan Bratislava || 6–2 || Sibir Novosibirsk || Slovnaft Arena || 10,055 || 7–4–2–8 || Livescores - Soccer - Scoresway
|-

|-bgcolor=ddffdd
|22 || 3 ||  Lev Praha || 1–2 || Slovan Bratislava || Tipsport Arena || 12,885 || 8–4–2–8 || Livescores - Soccer - Scoresway
|-bgcolor=ffbbbb
|23 || 14 || Lokomotiv Yaroslavl || 4–0 || Slovan Bratislava || Arena 2000 || 8,777 || 8–4–2–9 || Livescores - Soccer - Scoresway
|-bgcolor=ddffdd
|24 || 16 || Atlant Mytishchi || 0–2 || Slovan Bratislava || Mytishchi Arena || 5,750 || 9–4–2–9 || Livescores - Soccer - Scoresway
|-bgcolor=ffeeaa
|25 || 18 || Torpedo Nizhny Novgorod || 3 – 2 SO || Slovan Bratislava || Trade Union Sport Palace || 5,300 || 9–4–3–9 || Livescores - Soccer - Scoresway
|-bgcolor=ffbbbb
|26 || 21 || Slovan Bratislava || 1–4 || Torpedo Nizhny Novgorod || Slovnaft Arena || 10,055 || 9–4–3–10 || Livescores - Soccer - Scoresway
|-bgcolor=ddffdd
|27 || 23 || Slovan Bratislava || 3–2 || Atlant Mytishchi || Slovnaft Arena || 10,055 || 10–4–3–10 || Livescores - Soccer - Scoresway
|-bgcolor=ddffdd
|28 || 25 || Slovan Bratislava || 3–2 || Lokomotiv Yaroslavl || Slovnaft Arena || 10,055 || 11–4–3–10 || Livescores - Soccer - Scoresway
|-bgcolor=ffbbbb
|29 || 28 || Amur Khabarovsk || 3–0 || Slovan Bratislava || Platinum Arena || 7,100 || 11–4–3–11 || Livescores - Soccer - Scoresway
|-bgcolor=ddffdd
|30 || 30 || Sibir Novosibirsk || 1–2 || Slovan Bratislava || Ice Sports Palace Sibir || 5,000 || 12–4–3–11 || Livescores - Soccer - Scoresway
|-

|-bgcolor=ffbbbb
|31 || 2 || Metallurg Novokuznetsk || 3–2 || Slovan Bratislava || Sports Palace || 3,050 || 12–4–3–12 || Livescores - Soccer - Scoresway
|-bgcolor=ffbbbb
|32 || 4 || CSKA Moscow || 4–1 || Slovan Bratislava || CSKA Ice Palace || 2,552 || 12–4–3–13 || Livescores - Soccer - Scoresway
|-bgcolor=ddffdd
| 33 || 8 || Slovan Bratislava || 2–1 || Lev Praha  || Slovnaft Arena || 10,055 || 13–4–3–13 || Livescores - Soccer - Scoresway
|-bgcolor=d0e7ff
|34 || 19 || Slovan Bratislava || 1 – 0 SO || Salavat Yulaev Ufa || Slovnaft Arena || 10,055 || 13–5–3–13 || Livescores - Soccer - Scoresway
|-bgcolor=ffeeaa
|35 || 21 || Slovan Bratislava || 1 – 2 SO || Neftekhimik Nizhnekamsk || Slovnaft Arena || 10,055 || 13–5–4–13 || Livescores - Soccer - Scoresway
|-bgcolor=d0e7ff
|36 || 22 || Slovan Bratislava || 3 – 2 SO || Ak Bars Kazan || Slovnaft Arena || 10,055 || 13–6–4–13 || Livescores - Soccer - Scoresway
|-bgcolor=ffeeaa
|37 || 26 || Dynamo Moscow || 2 – 1 SO || Slovan Bratislava || Minor Arena || 3,500 || 13–6–5–13 || Livescores - Soccer - Scoresway
|-bgcolor=ffbbbb
|38 || 28 || SKA Saint Petersburg || 1–0 || Slovan Bratislava || Ice Palace || 11,600 || 13–6–5–14 || Livescores - Soccer - Scoresway
|-

|-bgcolor=ddffdd
|39 || 4 || Slovan Bratislava || 3–1 || Avtomobilist Yekaterinburg || Slovnaft Arena || 10,055 || 14–6–5–14 || Livescores - Soccer - Scoresway
|-bgcolor=d0e7ff
|40 || 6 || Slovan Bratislava || 4 – 3 SO || Metallurg Magnitogorsk || Slovnaft Arena || 10,055 || 14–7–5–14 || Livescores - Soccer - Scoresway
|-bgcolor=d0e7ff
|41 || 8 || Slovan Bratislava || 4 – 3 OT || Traktor Chelyabinsk || Slovnaft Arena || 10,055 || 14–8–5–14 || Livescores - Soccer - Scoresway
|-bgcolor=ddffdd
|42 || 15 ||  Lev Praha || 3–4 || Slovan Bratislava || O2 Arena || 15,543 || 15–8–5–14 || Livescores - Soccer - Scoresway
|-bgcolor=ffbbbb
|43 || 18 || Yugra Khanty-Mansiysk || 3–1 || Slovan Bratislava || Arena Ugra || 2,750 || 15–8–5–15 || Livescores - Soccer - Scoresway
|-bgcolor=d0e7ff
|44 || 20 || Avangard Omsk || 2 – 3 SO || Slovan Bratislava || Omsk Arena || 9,870 || 15–9–5–15 || Livescores - Soccer - Scoresway
|-bgcolor=ddffdd
|45 || 22 ||  Barys Astana || 2–4 || Slovan Bratislava || Kazakhstan Sport Palace || 2,779 || 16–9–5–15 || Livescores - Soccer - Scoresway
|-bgcolor=ffbbbb
|46 || 26 || Slovan Bratislava || 0–3 || Severstal Cherepovets || Slovnaft Arena || 10,055 || 16–9–5–16 || Livescores - Soccer - Scoresway
|-bgcolor=ffbbbb
|47 || 28 || Slovan Bratislava || 1–2 || Dinamo Minsk  || Slovnaft Arena || 10,055 || 16–9–5–17 || Livescores - Soccer - Scoresway
|-

|-bgcolor=ddffdd
|48 || 1 || Slovan Bratislava || 3–0 || Vityaz Chekhov || Slovnaft Arena || 10,055 || 17–9–5–17 || Livescores - Soccer - Scoresway
|-bgcolor=ffbbbb
|49 || 3 || Slovan Bratislava || 4–5 || Lev Praha  || Slovnaft Arena || 10,055 || 17–9–5–18 || Livescores - Soccer - Scoresway
|-bgcolor=d0e7ff
|50 || 13 || Spartak Moscow || 3 – 4 OT || Slovan Bratislava || LDS Sokolniki || 3,274 || 17–10–5–18 || Livescores - Soccer - Scoresway
|-bgcolor=d0e7ff
|51 || 15 ||  Donbass Donetsk || 3 – 4 OT || Slovan Bratislava || Druzhba Arena || 3,976 || 17–11–5–18 || Livescores - Soccer - Scoresway
|-bgcolor=ffbbbb
|52 || 17 ||  Dinamo Riga || 3–1 || Slovan Bratislava || Arena Riga || 5,770 || 17–11–5–19 || Livescores - Soccer - Scoresway
|-

|-
| align="center"|

Playoffs

|-  style="text-align:center; background:#cfc;"
|-bgcolor=ffbbbb
|1 || 20 Feb || Dynamo Moscow || 5–1 || Slovan Bratislava || Minor Arena || 5,212 || 0 – 1 || Livescores - Soccer - Scoresway
|-bgcolor=ffbbbb
|2 || 21 Feb || Dynamo Moscow || 3 – 2 OT || Slovan Bratislava || Minor Arena || 5,252 || 0 – 2 || Livescores - Soccer - Scoresway
|-bgcolor=ffbbbb
|3 || 24 Feb || Slovan Bratislava || 2–4 || Dynamo Moscow || Slovnaft Arena || 9,666 || 0 – 3 || Livescores - Soccer - Scoresway
|-bgcolor=ffbbbb
|4 || 25 Feb || Slovan Bratislava || 2–3 || Dynamo Moscow || Slovnaft Arena || 10,055 || 0 – 4 || Livescores - Soccer - Scoresway
|-

|-
| align="center"|

Detailed records

Standings
Source: khl.ru
After games of 17 February 2013

Bobrov Division

Western Conference

y – Won division; c – Won Continental Cup (best record in KHL);
BOB – Bobrov Division, TAR – Tarasov Division

Final roster

As of 1 March 2013

|}

Player statistics
Source: Eliteprospects

Skaters

Goaltenders

Milestones and team statistics

Team milestones

Team statistics
All statistics are for regular season only.

Notes

Player milestones

Source:

Roster changes

Transactions
Source: EuroHockey.com

Draft picks
Slovan's picks at the 2012 KHL Junior Draft in Chelyabinsk.

See also
HC Slovan Bratislava all-time record
List of HC Slovan Bratislava seasons

References

Bratislava
HC Slovan Bratislava seasons
Bratislava